Neterkheperre Meryptah called Pipi II was a High Priest of Ptah during the 21st Dynasty. He was High priest during the reigns of Psusennes I, Amenemope, Osochor and Siamun.

Pipi II is known from the Genealogy of Ankhefensekhmet, where he is said to be a Prophet (hm nTr) during the time of Pharaoh Psusennes I. He is also mentioned in a genealogy from the Louvre, where he is given the title of High Priest of Ptah.

Pipi II is attested under Siamun on a temple building at Memphis. The gateway of this temple features a lintel mentioning the high priest "Neterkheperre Meryptah who is called Piupiu". The name "Neterkheperre Meryptah" adopted by Pipi II is based on the prenomen of Pharaoh Siamun.

References

Publications regarding Berlin 23673 and Louvre 96 
L. Borchardt, Die Mittel zur Zeitlichen Festlegung von Punkten de Aegyptischen Geschichte und ihre Anwendung, 1935, pg 96-112
E. Chassinat, Recueil de travaux relatifs à la philologie et à l'archéologie égyptiennes et assyriennes, 22 (1900) 16-17, No 54
Malinines, Posner, Vercoutter, Catalogue des steles de Sérapéum de Memphis, I, 1968, No. 52, pp. 48–49
Kees, Zeitschrift fur Agyptischer Sprache, 87 (1962), 146-9

Memphis High Priests of Ptah
Ancient Egyptian priests
People of the Twenty-first Dynasty of Egypt
Year of birth unknown
Year of death unknown